Pasquale Gallo is a Paralympian athlete from France who competes mainly in category T12 sprint events.

Pasquale competed in the T12 100m and 200m in the 2008 Summer Paralympics in Beijing. Though he failed to win a medal in either of these events he was part of the French team that won  the bronze medal in the visually impaired 4 × 100 m.

External links
 

Year of birth missing (living people)
Living people
Paralympic athletes of France
Paralympic bronze medalists for France
Athletes (track and field) at the 2008 Summer Paralympics
Medalists at the 2008 Summer Paralympics
Paralympic medalists in athletics (track and field)
French male sprinters
21st-century French people